Julia Ecklar (born 1964) is an American science fiction author and a singer and writer of filk music who recorded numerous albums in the Off Centaur label in the early 1980s, including Minus Ten and Counting, Horse-Tamer's Daughter, and Genesis. Her Divine Intervention album, released in 1986, was the first filk genre release to combine the lyrical elements with orchestral and rock arrangements.

Ecklar's first solo album in 25 years, Horsetamer, was finished by March 2013, and produced by Michael Moricz.

L.A. Graf
L.A. Graf is a pseudonym for the writing team formed by Ecklar, Karen Rose Cercone, and Melissa Crandall for the 1992 Star Trek novel #60 Ice Trap. For all later L.A. Graf novels the writing team was a partnership between Ecklar and Cercone. L.A. Graf reportedly stands for Let's All Get Rich and Famous.

Bibliography

as Julia Ecklar
 The Kobayashi Maru (1989) Pocket Books: Star Trek #47, 
 "The Music Box" (Analog, September 1989)
 "Carmen Miranda and the Maracas of Death" (Carmen Miranda's Ghost Is Haunting Space Station Three, 1990 anthology)
 "Extra Ellies" (Analog, May 1990)
 "Burning Bridges" (Analog, November 1990)
 "A Sweet Disorder" (Analog, September 1991)
 Noah's Ark series
 "Blood Relations" (Analog, June 1992)
 "Ice Nights" (Analog, October 1992)
 "Tide of Stars" (Analog, January 1995)
 "The Human Animal" (Analog, April 1995)
 "Promised Lives" (Fantasy & Science Fiction, September 1993)
 ReGenesis (1995) Ace Books, 
 "Thylacine Dream" (Otherwere: Stories of Transformation, 1996 anthology)

as L.A. Graf
 Ice Trap (July 1992) Star Trek #60, 
 Death Count (November 1992) Star Trek #62, 
 Firestorm (January 1994) Star Trek #68, 
 Traitor Winds (June 1994) Star Trek #70, 
 Caretaker (February 1995) Star Trek: Voyager #1, 
 Extreme Prejudice (March 1995) Alien Nation #7, 
 Time's Enemy (August 1996) Star Trek: DS9 #16, 
 Armageddon Sky (September 1997) Star Trek: Day of Honor #2, 
 War Dragons (June 1998) Star Trek: The Captain's Table #1, 
 "Reflections" (The Lives of Dax, 1999 anthology) 
 Rough Trails (July 2000) Star Trek: New Earth Book Three, 
 The Janus Gate (October 2002 omnibus) 
 Present Tense (June 2002) 
 Future Imperfect (June 2002) 
 Past Prologue (July 2002)

Discography
 To Touch the Stars: A Musical Celebration of Space Exploration  (contributor)
 Minus Ten and Counting (contributor)
 Traveller (re-released on CD in 2006)
 Genesis (out of print)
 Divine Intervention (Prometheus Music, 1986)
 Walkabout (Dodeka Records)
 Balance (DAG Productions)
 Space Heroes & Other Fools (contributor, 1983)
 Horsetamer's Daughter (Off Centaur Publications, 1983)
 A Wolfrider's Reflections (Warp Graphics, 1987)

Awards
 John W. Campbell Award for Best New Writer 1991
 Inducted into the Filk Hall of Fame 1996

Pegasus Awards

 Best Female Filker 1984
 Best Performer 1987
 Best Writer/Composer 1990
 Best Literature Song 1990: "Daddy's Little Girl"
 Best War/Vengeance Song 1991: "Temper of Revenge"
 Best Filk Song 1992: "God Lives on Terra"
 Best Sorcery Song 1997: "The Dark Is Rising" (with Susan Cooper)
 Best Classic Filk Song 2004: "Ladyhawke!"
 Best Classic Filk Song 2011: "The Phoenix"

See also
 List of Star Trek novels

References

External links
 Julia's LiveJournal – focuses on her graduate education and interest in animal behavior.
 
 L. A. Graf (joint pseudonym) at LC Authorities, with 12 records

1964 births
20th-century American novelists
20th-century American women writers
21st-century American novelists
21st-century American women writers
American science fiction writers
American women novelists
Filkers
John W. Campbell Award for Best New Writer winners
Living people
Pseudonymous women writers
Women science fiction and fantasy writers
20th-century pseudonymous writers
21st-century pseudonymous writers